Personalized Medicine is a bimonthly peer-reviewed medical journal covering personalized medicine. It was established in 2004 and is published by Future Medicine.

Abstracting and indexing 
The journal is indexed by Chemical Abstracts, Current Contents/Clinical Medicine, Embase/Excerpta Medica, Science Citation Index Expanded, and Scopus. According to the Journal Citation Reports, the journal has a 2016 impact factor of 1.010, ranking it 223rd out of 256 journals in the category "Pharmacology & Pharmacy".

References

External links
 

English-language journals
General medical journals
Future Science Group academic journals
Publications established in 2004
Bimonthly journals